The 1996 London Marathon was the 16th running of the annual marathon race in London, United Kingdom, which took place on Sunday, 21 April. The elite men's race was won by Mexico's Dionicio Cerón, who won his third straight title in a time of 2:10:00 hours, and the women's race was won by home athlete Liz McColgan in 2:27:54. 

In the wheelchair races, Britain's David Holding (1:43:48) and Tanni Grey (2:00:10) won the men's and women's divisions, respectively. Grey's winning time was a course record.

Around 68,000 people applied to enter the race, of which 39,173 had their applications accepted and 27,134 started the race. A total of 26,806 runners finished the race.

Results

Men

Women

Wheelchair men

Wheelchair women

References

Results
Results. Association of Road Racing Statisticians. Retrieved 2020-04-19.

External links

Official website

1996
London Marathon
Marathon
London Marathon